Microgaza rotella is a species of sea snail, a marine gastropod mollusk in the family Solariellidae.

Subspecies
 Microgaza rotella inornata Quinn, 1979 (synonym: Microgaza inornata Quinn, 1979)
 Microgaza rotella rotella (Dall, 1881)

Description
The depressed shell is small and grows to a length of 6.8 mm.  It has five whorls, somewhat flattened above and below. The nucleus is small, translucent white, and with the two first whorls polished. The nucleus is smooth or marked only by faint growth lines. The remainder of the whorls show a narrow puckered band revolving immediately below the suture, on which the shell matter is as it were pinched up into slight elevations at regular intervals, about half a millimeter apart. In some specimens, outside of this band an impressed line revolves with the shell. The remainder is smooth, shining or with evanescent traces of revolving lines impressed from within and strongest about the rounded periphery. The base of the shell is rounded toward the umbilical
carina over which it seems to be drawn into flexuously radiating well-marked plications (about thirty-two on the last turn). These plications disappear a third of the way toward the periphery. The wall of the umbilicus is concave, overhung by the carina. The turns of the shell are so coiled that the part of each whorl uncovered by its successor forms a narrow spiral plane ascending to the apex like a spiral staircase or screw thread. The thin columella is straight and lacks a callus. The aperture is rounded except at the angle of the umbilical carina. The margin is thin, sharp, not reflected or thickened. There is no callus on the body whorl in the aperture. 

The shell is whitish or greenish. The nacre is less brilliant in dead or deep-water specimens. The shell shows zigzag brown lines variously transversely disposed and disappearing on the base.

Distribution
This species occurs in the following locations:
 Aruba
 Bonaire
 Caribbean Sea
 Cuba
 Curaçao
 Gulf of Mexico
 Puerto Rico
 Atlantic Ocean off North Carolina.

References

External links
 To Biodiversity Heritage Library (20 publications)
 To Encyclopedia of Life
 To USNM Invertebrate Zoology Mollusca Collection
 To ITIS
 To World Register of Marine Species
 

rotella
Gastropods described in 1881